Multiple sports have concussion substitutes:

 Substitute (cricket)#Concussion substitute, about concussion substitutes in cricket
 Substitute (association football)#Concussion substitute, about concussion substitutes in association football

See also 

 Concussions in sport, a general article